The thoracic spinal nerve 4 (T4) is a spinal nerve of the thoracic segment.

It originates from the spinal column from below the thoracic vertebra 4 (T4).

References

Spinal nerves